MV OS 35 is a bulk carrier registered in Tuvalu, a flag of convenience. The vessel first came into news when a piracy attack on her off the coast of Somalia was thwarted jointly by ships of China’s People’s Liberation Army Navy and of the Indian Navy.

Vessel particulars
It has a gross tonnage of 20,947 and a deadweight of 35,362. The vessel was built as Golden Harvest. Thereafter, as the ship changed hands, its name was changed to Addu Comet, JS Comet and finally OS 35.

2017 piracy attack

In March 2017, OS 35 departed from Port Kelang, laden with cargo for Aden, Yemen. In April 2017, as OS 35 was sailing off the coast of Somalia and Yemen, a skiff with suspected Somalian pirates tried to board the vessel. The vessel initially attempted anti piracy manoeuvres which had no effect on the pirate boats. Thereafter, all the ships crew mustered in the ship's citadel while the handful of privately contracted armed security personnel (PCASP) on board attempted to delay the pirates boarding. This too had limited effect and the pirates continued to come extremely close to the large bulk carrier and finally boarded and hijacked the vessel in the position 12°51′N 50°42′E.

Meanwhile, Chinese and Indian navy ships that were patrolling the region received the alert that had been sent by the ship using its SSAS (Ship Security Alert System) and proceeded to assist the vessel. The Indian navy provided air cover while the Chinese ship arrived on scene. An 18-man Chinese special force team boarded the hijacked bulk carrier. The pirates abandoned OS 35 and fled before the special force team arrived.

2022 collision 

In August 2022, OS 35 collided with the tanker Adam LNG carrying liquefied natural gas off the coast of Gibraltar and was beached. Authorities said there had been a significant fuel oil leak on 1 September and booms had been deployed in an attempt to stop the oil spreading. By the morning of 2 September, 80% of the ship's diesel fuel had been removed. Spanish authorities were placed on alert and patrols were sent to coastal areas to monitor possible pollution, in what is called the Bay of Gibraltar.

References 

Maritime incidents in 2017
Maritime incidents in 2022
Piracy in Somalia
1989 ships
Humanitarian aid